Graduate Women in Science (GWIS), formerly known as Sigma Delta Epsilon Graduate Women in Science (SDE-GWIS), is an international organization for women in science, first established in 1921 at Cornell University in Ithaca, New York, United States. The organization currently has over 1,000 members and dozens of chapters spread across the United States as well as an international chapter that was established in 2013.

The organization is a non-profit 501(c)(3) organization that works to connect, lead, and empower women in science. It does so through offering grants, awards, and fellowships; cultivating a powerful international network of women scientists; holding annual conferences and sponsoring additional meetings and symposia; publishing a free monthly newsletter; and promoting the participation and representation of women in science-related events. Membership is open to anyone, regardless of sex, who has at least a bachelor's degree in a scientific discipline.

The GWIS National Meeting is held annually in June and is hosted by a local chapter.

Mission
Building a global community to inspire, support, recognize, and empower women in science.

History
GWIS was established in 1921 at Cornell University by a group of  women pursuing graduate degrees in the sciences, interested in the status of women in scientific fields, and interested in building a social network for women in science. Initially, the organization was formally named the Sigma Delta Epsilon Graduate Women's Scientific Fraternity—SDE for short. In 1922, SDE joined forces with women at the University of Wisconsin-Madison, voting and accepting its National Constitution, thus establishing the organization as a national organization.

The first National Convention was held in 1922.

In 1931, GWIS established its Formal Fellowships Fund, and the First Research Fellowship was awarded in 1941 to Frances Dorris-Humm, PhD at Yale University studying experimental embryology.

In 1970, the Eloise Gerry Fellowship Fund, the first of the GWIS fellowships funded by a single individual rather than by fundraising and small membership contributions, was established.

Hope E. Hopps who co-developed the Rubella vaccine was elected National President in 1972.

List of Chapters 
 Auburn, AL
 Boston, MA
 Central Kentucky
 Chapter-At-Large
 Chicago
 Eastern North Carolina
 Eastern South Dakota
 Greater Maryland
 Hawaii
 Hershey, PA
 International Chapter
 Iowa City, IA
 Ithaca, NY
 Los Angeles, CA
 Madison, WI
 Mid-Michigan
 National Capital
 New York City Metro
 Northern Colorado
 Orange County, CA
 Philadelphia, PA
 Research Triangle, NC
 Richmond, VA
 San Diego, CA
 State College, PA
 Twin Cities, MN

References

External links
 Official website

Organizations for women in science and technology
Organizations established in 1921
Student organizations in the United States
1921 establishments in New York (state)
Non-profit organizations based in Massachusetts